Gongylus is a genus of praying mantises in the family Empusidae. Characterized by extremely slender limbs with large appendages, at least one species (Gongylus gongylodes) is kept as a pet by hobbyists. Males of the species are capable of flight.

The Greek word   means ‘round’.

See also
List of mantis genera and species

References

Empusidae
Mantodea genera